Dariapur community development block is a rural area earmarked for administration and development in Saran district . The area is administered by a Block Development Officer. It is the largest Block of Saran District in terms of population. A community development block covers several gram panchayats, Panchayat Samiti (Block), Primary Agricultural Co-operative societies (PACS) and other local administrative unit at the village level. It is represented by Parsa Vidhan Sabha constituency in Bihar Legislative Assembly and Saran Lok Sabha constituency in Indian parliament.
Currently, C.D.Blocks are administrative units of 3rd level in Bihar state of India (equal to Tehsil in other states). Rail Wheel Plant, Bela is located in Dariapur.

Demographics 
Dariapur Block of Saran district has highest population among all community development blocks  of saran district . Currently there are 20 community development blocks in the district. As of Ministry of Drinking Water and Sanitation 2009 report and 2011 Census, these were the findings.

Major religion followed in this area is Hinduism. There is a small Muslim minority also present.

Gram panchayats and Panchayat Samiti   
Following are the twenty five Gram Panchayats and Panchayat samitis ( Block Development councils )  are present in Dariyapur block:
 Driyapur
 Bela 
 Pirari Dih 
 Hariharpur
 Bishambharpur
 Fatahpur Chain
 Pratappur
 sajanpur Matihan
 Akbarpur
 Mujouna
 Khanpur
 Kakarhat
 Sutihar
 Jitwarpur
 Pojhoi Khajouli
 Natha Chapra
 Mohmmadpur
 Bajhiya
 Harna
 Bisahi
 Saidpur
 Barwe
 Darihara
 Manpura
 Magarpal

Primary Agricultural Co-operative Systems 
PACS is a Bihar Government scheme to improve Village economy and is administered by. There are 25 PACS in Dariyapur Block and these are as follows : Akbarpur, Bajahiya, Barwe, Bela, Bisahi, Bishambharpur, Darihara, Dariyapur, Fatahpur Chain, Hariharpur, Harna, Jitwarpur, Kakarahat, Khanpur, Magarpal, Manpura, Mohmmadpur, Mojouna, Natha Chapra, Pirari Dih
, Pojhi Khajouli, Pratappur, Saidpur, Sajanpur Maithan, Sutihar

References 

Community development blocks in Saran district